Cosmic Messenger is an album by French jazz fusion artist Jean-Luc Ponty, released in 1978.

Track listing 
All songs by Jean-Luc Ponty.
"Cosmic Messenger" – 4:38
"The Art of Happiness" – 4:33
"Don't Let the World Pass You By" – 6:23
"I Only Feel Good With You" – 3:05
"Puppets' Dance" – 3:40
"Fake Paradise" – 5:41
"Ethereal Mood" – 4:03
"Egocentric Molecules" – 5:44

Personnel 
 Jean-Luc Ponty – acoustic & electric violin, five-string electric violin, organ, lead synthesizer, Vako Orchestron
 Allan Zavod – keyboards
 Joaquin Lievano – acoustic & electric guitar
 Peter Maunu – acoustic & electric guitar, guitar synthesizer
 Ralphe Armstrong – electric bass guitar, fretless bass guitar
 Casey Scheuerell – drums, percussion

Production 
 Engineer & mixing: Ed E. Thacker
 Assistant engineers: Brian Leshon, Chris Gregg, Rick Collins, Russ Bracher
 Mastered by Greg Calbi
 Claudia Ponty – cover concept
 Daved Levitan – front cover painting
 Gary Heery – back cover photo
 Sam Emerson – inner sleeve photos

Recorded at Cherokee Studios, Hollywood, California, and Chateau Recorders, North Hollywood, California.
Mixed at Chateau Recorders.
Mastered at Sterling Sound Inc., New York City, New York.

Chart positions

References

External links 
 Jean-Luc Ponty - Cosmic Messenger (1978) album review by Richard S. Ginell, credits & releases at AllMusic
 Jean-Luc Ponty - Cosmic Messenger (1978) album releases & credits at Discogs
 Jean-Luc Ponty - Cosmic Messenger (1978) album to be listened as stream on Spotify

Jean-Luc Ponty albums
1978 albums
Atlantic Records albums